Komarovo is a rural locality (a settlement) in Kulikovskoye Rural Settlement of Krasnoborsky District, Arkhangelsk Oblast, Russia. The population was 417 as of 2010. There are 11 streets.

Geography 
Komarovo is located 74 km northeast of Krasnoborsk (the district's administrative centre) by road. Kulikovo is the nearest rural locality.

References 

Rural localities in Krasnoborsky District